Philipp Jens Richardsen (born 3 May 1976 in Vienna, Austria) is an Austrian classical pianist.

Life and career 
Born into a family of medical doctors, he received first piano lessons at the age of five. His formal music education includes the University of Music and Performing Arts, Vienna (1993-2000), where he studied under Michael Krist, and the University of California, Santa Barbara (2004-2007), where his principal teacher was Canadian pianist and Microsoft MVP Paul Berkowitz. Upon graduation with a Doctor of Musical Arts degree, he settled in South Korea, where he has been living since 2007. He has also received formal training in law at the University of Vienna (1995-1997) and in nonprofit management at Harvard University (2015-2016, Professional Certificate).

Richardsen, who is fluent in seven languages, including Korean, has been serving on the faculty of the music college at Mokwon University in Daejeon, South Korea, since 2008. Additionally, he has lectured at Kookmin University and Yonsei University, both in Seoul, and has been invited several times to coach managers of the Samsung Group, as part of the company's Global Forum and Future CEO programs. A former prize- and award winner at international piano competitions (Los Angeles International Liszt Competition, Palma d'oro Competition, Concours Grieg, and others), he has appeared on television and radio broadcasts in the United States and Korea; notable performance venues include Carnegie Hall, Harpa, the Elbphilharmonie in Hamburg, Munich Gasteig, Vienna Musikverein, Seoul Arts Center, Sejong Center for the Performing Arts, Esplanade – Theatres on the Bay, and the Sydney Opera House. Since 2015, he has been hosting The Classical Collection, a weekly radio show airing on TBS eFM (Korea).

Discography 
 Chopin 234: 2 Impromptus, 3 Nocturnes, 4 Ballades. Unyx Classical, UPC 8-88174-53452-7. Released February 15, 2014.

References

External links 
 Philipp Richardsen Official Website

University of California, Santa Barbara alumni
University of Music and Performing Arts Vienna alumni
Austrian classical pianists
Male classical pianists
Austrian people of German descent
1976 births
Living people
21st-century classical pianists
21st-century male musicians